Thierno Baldé (born 10 June 2002) is a French professional footballer who plays as a defender for  club Troyes.

Club career
Baldé is a youth academy graduate of Paris Saint-Germain (PSG). He signed his first professional contract with the club on 30 June 2020. On 13 July 2021, Baldé joined Ligue 2 club Le Havre on a season-long loan deal. He made his professional debut on 14 August 2021 in a goalless draw against Rodez. By the end of the season, he had made 31 appearances for Le Havre.

On 9 August 2022, Baldé signed for Ligue 1 club Troyes on a five-year contract.

Personal life
Baldé was born in France to a Guinean father and a Senegalese mother. He is the cousin of Senagelese footballer Vito Badiane.

Career statistics

Honours
Individual
Maurice Revello Tournament Best XI: 2022

References

External links
 
 
 

2002 births
Living people
Sportspeople from Villeneuve-Saint-Georges
Black French sportspeople
Association football defenders
French footballers
France youth international footballers
French sportspeople of Senegalese descent
Ligue 2 players
US Sénart-Moissy players
Paris Saint-Germain F.C. players
Le Havre AC players
ES Troyes AC players
Footballers from Val-de-Marne